The 1884 Massachusetts gubernatorial election was held on November 4. Incumbent Republican Governor George D. Robinson was re-elected to a second term in office over Democrat William Crowninshield Endicott.

General election

Results

See also
 1884 Massachusetts legislature

References

Governor
1884
Massachusetts
November 1884 events